Raja Rishi is a 1985 Indian Tamil-language Hindu mythological film directed by K. Shankar and produced by N. Sakunthala. The film stars Sivaji Ganesan, Prabhu, M. N. Nambiar and Nalini. It was released on 20 September 1985.

Plot 
The film narrates the story of Vishwamitra in a linear manner right from him being the King, his run-in with Vashista over Kamadenu cow leading him to take a vow that he too would become a brahmarishi like Vashista. He faces hurdle after hurdle placed in his path by Devendran. In the process, he falls in love, impregnates and abandons Menaka. Their daughter Shakuntala is brought up by another rishi. She falls in love with Dushyanta who is cursed to forget her by Durvasa. When Vishwamitra finds out about this, he goes on to fix her life and in the process learns humility. In the end, with the blessing of Vashista. who mentions that that was the only thing stopping Vishwamitra from becoming Brahmarishi, he is acknowledged and accredited as one.

Cast 

 Sivaji Ganesan as Vishvamitra / Kaushika
 Lakshmi as Menaka
 Nalini as Shakuntala
 Prabhu as King Dushyanta
 M. N. Nambiar as Sage Vashista
 R. S. Manohar as Sage Durvasa
 V. K. Ramasamy as Saint Kanvar
 Raadhika as Thilothamai
 Major Sundarrajan as Minister
 LIC Narasimhan as Kanvar Seedan
Unni Mary as Indirarani
 Vennira Aadai Moorthy as Ammani Husband also Kanvar Seedan
 Srikanth as Devendran
 Y. G. Mahendran as Agni Deva
 K. R. Vijaya as Parvati
 Vijayakumar as Dharmadevan/Yama Shiva
 Vanitha Krishnachandran as Ammani
 V. S. Raghavan as Dhasarathan
 A. K. Veerasami as Janagan

Soundtrack 
The music was composed by Ilaiyaraaja. The song "Maan Kanden" is set in Vasantha raga.

References

External links 
 

1980s Tamil-language films
1985 films
Films directed by K. Shankar
Films scored by Ilaiyaraaja
Hindu mythological films